Ebrahim Sulaiman Sait (1922 – 2005), known as "Mehboob-e-Millat" , was an Indian politician, born in Bangalore in a Cutchi Memon family, who served as an Indian Union Muslim League Member of Parliament from northern Kerala several times. He was also a founding member of All India Muslim Personal Law Board.

In 1994, while serving as its National President, Sait severed ties with the Indian Union Muslim League and formed the Indian National League.

Early life
Sait was born to Mohammed Sulaiman and Zainab Bai on 3 November 1922 at Bangalore. He obtained his Bachelor of Arts under-graduate degree from St. Joseph's College, Bangalore.

He married Mariyam Bai, from Mattancherry, in 1949.

Member of Parliament
Sait served as the National President of Indian Union Muslim League from 1973 to 1994.

Lok Sabha

Rajya Sabha

Notes

1922 births
2005 deaths
India MPs 1971–1977
India MPs 1967–1970
India MPs 1977–1979
India MPs 1980–1984
India MPs 1984–1989
India MPs 1989–1991
India MPs 1991–1996
Lok Sabha members from Kerala
Manjeri